Moshe Tamir may refer to one of the following people:

 Moshe Tamir (general), an Israeli brigadier general
 Moshe Tamir (painter), an Israeli painter